Jenny Teichman (1930 – 12 September 2018) was an Australian-British philosopher, writing mostly on ethics. She was born in Melbourne, Australia in 1930 and lived as a child in the artists' colony of Montsalvat. She married the lecturer and political commentator Max Teichmann. She taught mostly at Murray Edwards College, Cambridge, formerly known as New Hall, where she became an Emeritus Fellow. She taught for shorter periods in Australia, Canada and the USA. She was research fellow at Somerville College, Oxford, from 1957 until 1960.

She died on 12 September 2018.

Bibliography

Books

 Illegitimacy, Blackwell & Cornell UP 1982
 Pacifism & the Just War, Blackwell  1986
 Philosophy & the Mind, Blackwell 1988
 Philosophy: a Beginners Guide  (with Katherine Evans) Blackwell 1991, 1995, 1999 (translations in Polish, Spanish, Russian, Korean, Chinese & Georgian)
 Social Ethics a Students Guide, Blackwell  1996 (translations in Spanish, Indonesian, Korean & Polish)
 Ethics and Reality Ashgate, 2001
 Philosophers' Hobbies and other Essays [27 short papers] illustrated by Michael Jorgensen, Blackjack Press 392 Station Street, Carlton, VIC 3054, Australia  2003.
 The Philosophy of War & Peace, Imprint Academic, 2006

Anthologies
 Intention & Intentionality: Essays in Honour of GEM Anscombe (with Cora Diamond) Harvester Press 1979
 An Introduction to Modern European Philosophy  (with Graham White) Macmillan 1995 and 1998

Book reviews

References

External links
J. Teichman, Review of Aurel Kolnai's Sexual Ethics

J. Teichman, 'Dr Jekyll and Mr Hyde' (on Peter Singer)

1930 births
2018 deaths
20th-century Australian philosophers
Australian ethicists
Australian women philosophers
British philosophers
Fellows of New Hall, Cambridge
Quadrant (magazine) people
University of Melbourne alumni
Fellows of Somerville College, Oxford
20th-century Australian women